is a Japanese singer. She is a former member of Juice=Juice, an all-female pop group within Hello! Project.

Hello! Project groups and units
 Hello Pro Egg / Hello Pro Kenshusei
 Shin Minimoni (2009)
 Reborn Eleven (2011)
 Juice=Juice (2013–2020)
 Jurin (2013–2016)

Discography
for Karin Miyamoto's releases with Juice=Juice, see Juice=Juice#Discography.

Singles

Studio Albums

Solo DVDs

Live Concerts

Bibliography

Photobooks
 (June 12, 2014, Crocodile Books)
Karin sixteen (May 27, 2015, Crocodile Books)
Sunflower (October 21, 2016, Crocodile Books)
 (December 1, 2018, Crocodile Books)
RIN (May 20, 2020, Crocodile Books)

Notes

References

External links
 Official Hello! Project profile 
 Oricon profile 

Juice=Juice members
1998 births
Living people
Japanese women pop singers
Japanese idols
Musicians from Chiba Prefecture